The  was established in 1972 by an Act of the National Diet as a special legal entity to undertake international dissemination of Japanese culture, and became an Independent Administrative Institution under the jurisdiction of the Ministry of Foreign Affairs on 1 October 2003 under the "Independent Administrative Institution Japan Foundation Law".

The Japan Foundation aims towards comprehensive and effective development of its international cultural exchange programs in the following categories:

 Promotion of (Japanese) arts and cultural exchange
 Promotion of (overseas) Japanese-language education (the JLPT exam)
 Promotion of (overseas) Japanese studies and intellectual exchange – Japan Foundation Information Centers collect and provide information about international exchange and international cultural exchange standard bearers.

Prince Takamado served as administrator of the Japan Foundation from 1981 to 2002.

Japan Foundations worldwide 

The Japan Foundation is headquartered in Shinjuku, Tokyo and has a subsidiary office in Kyoto. There are also two domestic Japanese-Language Institutes in Saitama and Tajiri, Osaka.

Internationally, the Japan Foundation maintains 25 overseas branches in 24 countries:

Asia and Oceania 
  (Sydney)
  (Phnom Penh)
  (Beijing)
  (New Delhi)
  (Jakarta)
  (Vientiane)
  (Kuala Lumpur)
  (Yangon)
  (Manila)
  (Seoul)
  (Bangkok)
  (Hanoi)

The Americas 
  (São Paulo)
  (Toronto)
  (Mexico City)
  (Los Angeles, New York City)

Europe, Middle East and Africa 
  (Cairo)
  (Paris)
  (Cologne)
  (Budapest)
  (Rome)
  (Moscow)
  (Madrid)
  (London)

Wochi Kochi Magazine
The  is a Japanese website designed by the Japan Foundation to enhance the strength of information transmission about Japanese culture to the world. It replaced the paper magazines Kokusai-Kouryu (International Exchanges) (1974-2004) and Wochi-Kochi (Far and Near) (2004-2009). Those were the only domestic paper magazines which were especially published for "international cultural exchanges". The word "wochi-kochi" itself is a pronoun from ancient Japanese "Yamato" language meaning "here and there" or "the future and the present". As the web magazine title, "wochi-kochi" demonstrates places and times, and it expresses the desires to spread Japanese language/culture overseas, moreover, play a role as the cultural bridge among countries and people. Keeping those aspects from previous magazines, the Wochi-Kochi Magazine website carries interviews, contributed articles and serialized stories written by the experts from various professional fields each month.

Activities 

 Let's Learn Japanese – educational Japanese-language learning series, produced 1985, 1995, and 2007
 JF Nihongo - Japanese language classes offered using the Can-do evaluation system.
 Japanese Language Proficiency Test – Japan Foundation co-proctors exam overseas

Asian Cartoon Art Exhibition
From 1995 onward regularly inviting leading cartoonists from various Asian countries to conduct Asian Cartoon Exhibition and Conference at The Japan Foundation Asia Center, Tokyo as an annual event. Later on the same exhibition travels to the various Asian counties. In the process, it has employed the friendly medium of cartoons for introducing Asian societies to those who would like to know more about them and appreciate people other than their own kind.

See also 

 Nippon Foundation
 Korea Foundation
 Koyamada International Foundation
 Singapore International Foundation
 British Council
 Alliance Française
 Cultural Diplomacy
 Public diplomacy

References

External links

 Japan Cultural Profile National cultural portal for Japan created by Visiting Arts with Japan Foundation support
 International Societies (local-government-funded NPOs) in Japan to promote cultural and language exchange

Japanese culture
Japanese studies
Japanese-language education
Cultural promotion organizations
Independent Administrative Institutions of Japan
Organizations established in 1972
1972 establishments in Japan
Language advocacy organizations